James is an incorporated township in the Canadian province of Ontario, located in Timiskaming District. The primary community within the township is Elk Lake, which is located at the junction of Ontario Highway 65 and Ontario Highway 560.

The township had a population of 420 in the Canada 2016 Census, compared to 424 in 2011.

Elk Lake Airport and Elk Lake Water Aerodrome are located here.

History

Elk Lake began as a mining boom town when native silver was discovered in James Township in 1906. Mining activity peaked between 1907 and 1913, when there were about thirty active mining properties in the area. The population at one point reached almost 10,000 people. By 1908 the town included six large hotels, many stores, warehouses, banks, lawyer's offices, a post office, a hospital and a Mining Recorder's Office. The town of Elk Lake was incorporated in 1909 as the Corporation of the Township of James. The Township's first Reeve was the famous athlete and prospector Jack Munroe.

Access to Elk Lake was initially only by motorboat via the Montreal River. By 1909 the road from Elk Lake to Charlton could be traversed by coach, although commercial steamers on the Montreal River continued to provide summer access from Latchford for most heavy equipment and freight. The steamboat era on the Montreal River lasted only a few years, ending when a branch of the Temiskaming and Northern Ontario Railway (now Ontario Northland Railway) was built into Elk Lake in 1913.

Commercial logging in the Temiskaming area dates back to the 1840s. From 1907 to 1923, Booth maintained a large pulpwood depot in Elk Lake. In the spring of 1930, Booth completed the last log drive on the Montreal River shortly after he sold his local interest to the E.B. Eddy Company.

Today, Elk Lake's economy continues to be driven by a sustainable forest industry. The town also boasts a significant number of tourist camps and lodges offering excellent packages for the outdoor sports and nature enthusiasts.

The  Makobe-Grays River Provincial Park has protected the Makobe River since 1985. This popular whitewater canoeing route flows into the Montreal River at Elk Lake.

Demographics 

Mother tongue (2016):
 English as first language: 73.8%
 French as first language: 25.0%
 English and French as first language: 1.2%
 Other as first language: 1.2%

In popular culture
Canadian songwriter Hayden Desser recorded an album entitled Elk-Lake Serenade.

See also
List of townships in Ontario
List of francophone communities in Ontario

References

Other map sources:

External links
 

Municipalities in Timiskaming District
Single-tier municipalities in Ontario
Township municipalities in Ontario